The 2012 Central Michigan Chippewas football team represented Central Michigan University in the 2012 NCAA Division I FBS football season. They were led by third-year head coach Dan Enos and played their home games at Kelly/Shorts Stadium. They were a member of the West Division of the Mid-American Conference. They concluded the season with 7–6 overall, 4–4 MAC, and won the Little Caesars Pizza Bowl over Western Kentucky.

Schedule

Game summaries

Southeast Missouri State

Michigan State

@ Iowa

@ Northern Illinois

@ Toledo

Navy

Ball State

Akron

Western Michigan

@ Eastern Michigan

Miami (OH)

@ Massachusetts

WKU–Little Caesars Pizza Bowl

References

Central Michigan
Central Michigan Chippewas football seasons
Little Caesars Pizza Bowl champion seasons
Central Michigan Chippewas football